Piseco Airport  is a public-use airport one nautical mile (1.85 km) north of the central business district of Piseco, a hamlet in the Town of Arietta, Hamilton County, New York, United States. The airport is owned by the Town of Arietta. It is categorized as a general aviation facility in the FAA's National Plan of Integrated Airport Systems for 2009–2013.

Facilities and aircraft 
It has one runway designated 4/22 with an asphalt surface measuring 3,015 by 60 feet (919 x 18 m). It also has one helipad designated H1 which measures 40 by 40 feet (12 x 12 m). For the 12-month period ending September 25, 2009, the airport had 3,150 aircraft operations, an average of 262 per month: 97% general aviation and 3% military.

References

External links 
  diagram from New York State DOT
 Aerial image as of 14 May 1994 from USGS The National Map
 

Airports in New York (state)
Transportation in Hamilton County, New York
Adirondacks